Dušan Mihajlović (born 27 September 1948) is a Serbian politician. He served as the Minister of Internal Affairs and as the Deputy Prime Minister of Serbia from 2001 to 2004.

Early life and education
Mihajlović was born in Valjevo, FPR Yugoslavia on 27 September 1948. He earned a degree from the University of Belgrade's Law School.

Political career
Dušan Mihajlović reconstituted Social Democratic Youth in New Democracy or Liberals of Serbia with its base in Valjevo, Serbia. He was elected as member of the National Assembly of Serbia between 1993 and 1999.

During the 2000 Federal Republic of Yugoslavia presidential election, he participated in the Democratic Opposition of Serbia. He served as Deputy Prime Minister and Minister of Interior in the 2001-2004 government. Mihajlović was the leader of the Liberals of Serbia party.

References

External links

1948 births
Living people
Politicians from Valjevo
Government ministers of Serbia
Liberals of Serbia politicians
Members of the National Assembly (Serbia)
University of Belgrade Faculty of Law alumni
Interior ministers of Serbia